Faking It: The Quest for Authenticity in Popular Music is a book written in 2007 by Yuval Taylor and Hugh Barker. In this book the authors discuss the quest for authenticity in popular music and the influence that that quest has had in the type of music that is played and listened, in particular a preference for raw, simple, underproduced music as opposed to sophisticated, complex, carefully produced music.

Reviews

External links
 Faking It:A blog devoted mainly to questions of authenticity in popular music, by the authors

Related
Among the artists discussed in the book, the most prominent are:
 Nirvana, Lead Belly, John Lomax
 Mississippi John Hurt, Jack Owens (blues singer)
 Jimmie Rodgers (country singer)
 Elvis Presley
 The Monkees, The Archies
 Neil Young
 Disco, Donna Summer
 Moby, KLF
 Paul Simon, Buena Vista Social Club
 John Lydon, Sid Vicious

Books about pop music